The WeatherGens were a group of twelve fictional human individuals representing the weather's various moods, televised as short segments at the conclusion of ITN news bulletins on ITV to introduce ITV National Weather reports. They were created by the graphic designer Rob Kelly and were commissioned by Tutssels from London on behalf of the British energy company Powergen (now called E.ON UK) and designed by the avant-garde company New RenaisSAnce. The WeatherGens made their television debut on 20 November 1996 and were last shown on-screen on 19 October 2001.

Overview
The WeatherGens were a group of twelve fictional human individuals broadcast as short segments at the conclusion of ITN news bulletins and were also used to introduce the ITV weather forecast. Each character represented the various moods of the weather: Nimbella (cloud and rain), Brellina (rain), Gilda (sunny), Shivera (cold weather), Crystella (snow), Florta (breezy), Norwin (wind and windswept), Cyan (cold weather conditions), Mirka (fog and mist), Frice (ice and frost), Helios (cloud and sun), and Aurora (dry and hot).

Production
Powergen (now called E.ON UK), a British energy company responsible for providing electricity and gas to homes in the United Kingdom, commissioned the London-based design company Tutssels to commission a new group of idents to introduce its sponsored weather forecasts on ITV. They were named WeatherGens after PowerGen and were created by the graphic designer Rob Kelly, who was advised by PowerGen to make some of the models more threatening to reflect the issues of inclement weather. Carolyn Corben and Harvey Bertram-Brown of New RenaisSAnce, an avant-garde company that designs clothing, costumes, sets and pop videos, were responsible for designing the WeatherGens costumes and make-up.

Corben said of the concept, "It was perfect for us. Our initial brief – well, it was like no brief at all to start with, we were told to go mad and not to rule anything out." The project cost £500,000 and it took seven months to complete each of the fifteen second shots with six people from outside New RenaisSAnce employed to assist in the project. It was filmed in the style of a television advert, a route considered "radical" by Corben. Each shoot was completed in one day and the filming crew had to maintain stability of the costumes between shots in order to avoid injuring the models. The WeatherGens received letters of praise but were criticised for scaring young children.

Retirement
In May 2001 Powergen began reviewing its creative account for the ITV weather forecast with eight undisclosed agencies for a new brand of weather segments. The company selected the marketing agency Soul to produce the segments, which depicted individuals and businesses undertaking a range of daily activities and the weather was utilised to represent its differing moods.

Other uses
The WeatherGens were used by the international environmental network movement Friends of the Earth who distributed leaflets outside Powergen's annual general meeting at the ICC Birmingham on 13 July 1998 as part of its campaign to convince the energy company to increase its investment in renewable energy sources.

References

External links
 

ITV Weather
1996 in British television
Television presentation in the United Kingdom
Weather television
British television commercials
Television characters introduced in 1996